Below is a list of newspapers published in Afghanistan.

Newspapers

See also
Communications in Afghanistan
Media of Afghanistan

External links
Afghanistan newspapers List of Afghan newspapers and online news sites in English
Newspapers List of Afghanistan
Newspaper map worldwide
Kārawān in DigitalCommons@UNO

References 

Afghantistan
 
Newspapers